Baby Pals is a simulation-style video game for the Nintendo DS developed by American studio Brain Toys that released in North America and in the PAL  region in late 2007 and early 2008. The objective of the game is to take care of a virtual baby through certain tasks as feeding, bathing, and teaching just like a real father or mother would do. Players can choose the gender of the baby.

Reception

IGN rated the 4 of 10 stating that "I'd really recommend passing this one by, and I'd hope that the developers of this one would think twice about including elements like that again in any potential future follow-up."

Alleged subliminal message
According to news reports, a mother who purchased the game for her child reported that the babies in the game say something that sounds like "Islam is the light" under certain circumstances. The babies in the game generally do not have any spoken dialog. However, according to a representative from the game's publisher, Crave Entertainment, the sound bit came from "a recording of a 5-month-old baby babbling non-intelligible phrases." He pointed out that "the baby being recorded was too young to pronounce these words let alone a whole grammatically correct phrase."

See also
Purr Pals

References

External links
 GameSpot Summary

2007 video games
Crave Entertainment games
Nintendo DS-only games
Nintendo DS games
THQ games
Virtual baby video games
Video games developed in the United States